Jerome C. Henderson, also known as Wang Dexun, (born 1936) is a Singaporean basketball player. He competed in the men's tournament at the 1956 Summer Olympics.

References

External links
 

1936 births
Living people
Singaporean men's basketball players
Olympic basketball players of Singapore
Basketball players at the 1956 Summer Olympics
Singaporean sportspeople of Chinese descent
Place of birth missing (living people)